Amanã River is a river of Amazonas and Pará states in north-western Brazil.

The Amanã River flows through the Alto Maués Ecological Station. 
It joins the Parauari River to form the Maués Açu River.

See also
List of rivers of Amazonas
List of rivers of Pará

References

Brazilian Ministry of Transport

Rivers of Amazonas (Brazilian state)
Rivers of Pará